J. William "Willie" Reynolds is an American politician. He served as a city councilman of Bethlehem, Pennsylvania from 2008 until 2021 and is currently the city's 12th and incumbent  Mayor, starting his term in 2022 which is set to expire in 2026. He is eligible to stand for re-election.

Early life
Reynolds is a lifelong Bethlehem Native. He attended Liberty High School and received his bachelor's degree in education from Moravian University.

Career

Educator

He served as a legislative aide to state representative Steve Samuelson from May 2003 through September 2009. He then worked as a history teacher in the Allentown School District from September 2009 until his mayoral campaign in 2021.

Bethlehem City Council
Reynolds was elected in the Bethlehem City Council in 2007 and took office in 2008. At the time he was the youngest person to be elected to this position. He was elected the President of City Council in 2016, and held this office until he became Mayor in 2021. At the time of stepping down he was the longest serving member of the City Council. He was known for his activism for civil rights and equality, and his push for financial accountability for economic development programs. He has supported the City Council's efforts to decriminalize marijuana and reform the police.

Mayor of Bethlehem

Reynolds had unsuccessfully run for Mayor in 2013 where he was narrowly defeated in the Democratic primary by Robert Donchez 51.8 percent to 48.2 percent, a margin of 184 votes. Due to the Republican Party not fielding any candidates, besides a write-in, the Democratic primary was treated as the election proper. Reynolds announced his intention to run for Mayor again on January 5, 2021.  After securing the Democratic Party's nomination he ran against Republican John Kachmar, defeating him soundly, 64.3 percent to 35.7 percent. 

As Mayor, Reynolds hopes to keep Bethlehem one of the "best places to live in America", and to continue to recover from the closing of the Bethlehem Steel Plant. He has also come out in support of the American Rescue Plan which contributed $34.4 million of the city's budget of $118.4 million, saying that this money will be used to allow the city to continue capital projects without going into debt, and further stated it was a contributing factor in Reynolds' ability to reduce the city's debt from $170 million to $110 million. As part of the budget for 2023, the city's contract with Republic Services for trash collection expired and mayor Reynolds and the city council have been unable to reach an agreement on a new contractor despite meeting on the subject 97 times. 

Additionally, during Reynold's tenure, the United Proclamation of the Gospel, the city's Moravian Church announced it would be merging its services in a cost cutting measure and seeking to sell three of their historic churches. The two most interested parties where Lehigh University who sought to buy the churches and demolish them for an expansion to the university, and Reynolds and the city who wished to buy the churches and demolish them to build affordable housing. After hearing a $3.7 million dollar bid from Lehigh, and an equal counteroffer from the City, the church put the plan to sell the churches on hold indefinitely, unhappy with the prospect of the historic churches being demolished. Instead, they filed a petition with the United States Department of the Interior to have the churches listed as part of the World Heritage Commission alongside historic Moravian churches in Northern Ireland and Denmark which would prevent the demolition of the buildings. Despite this being against his and the city's initial wishes, mayor Reynolds has welcomed the prospect of a new World Heritage Site in Bethlehem.

Personal life

Reynolds is married to Dr. Natalie Bieber. They both reside in North Bethlehem in the same neighborhood Reynolds was born. He is a member of the Moravian University Board of Trustees and is on the Bethlehem Area Public Library's board of directors.

References

Mayors of Bethlehem, Pennsylvania
Living people
Moravian University alumni
Liberty High School (Bethlehem, Pennsylvania) alumni
1982 births
Pennsylvania Democrats